Senator Harsdorf may refer to:

James Harsdorf (born 1950), Wisconsin State Senate
Sheila Harsdorf (born 1956), Wisconsin State Senate